= Convent of Santo Domingo, Arequipa =

Convent in Arequipa, Peru

Coordinates: 16.4008°S 71.5344°W

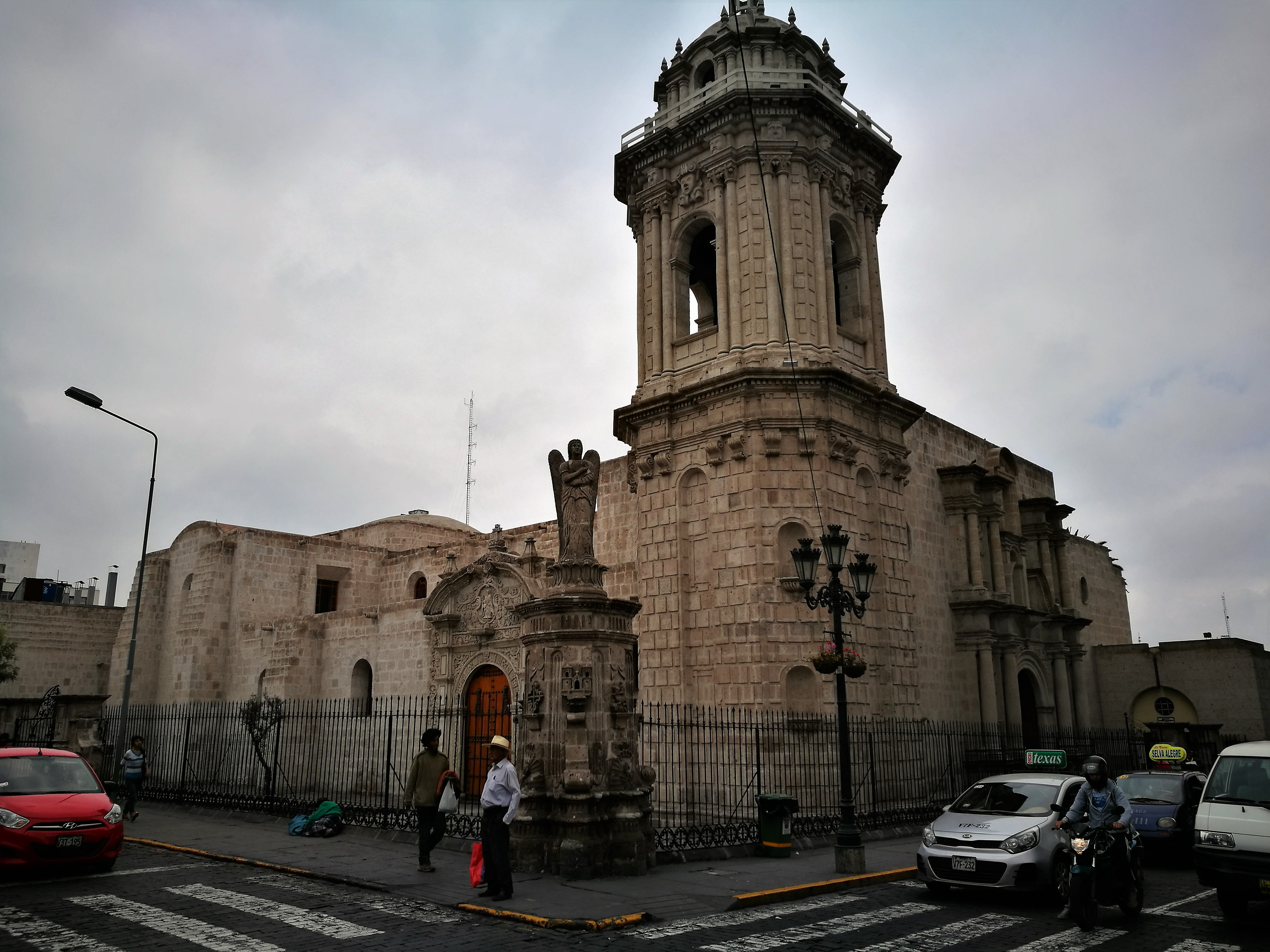
Church and Convent of Santo Domingo

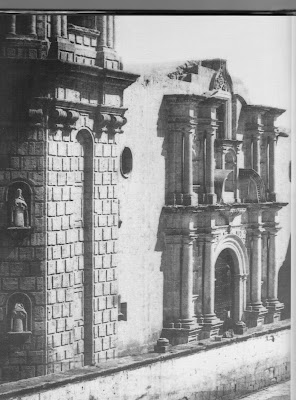
Church of Santo Domingo in 1868 (Arequipa).

The Church and Convent of Santo Domingo is a convent in the city of Arequipa, Peru. It is part of the UNESCO World Heritage Site "Historic Center of the City of Arequipa".

== See also ==
- List of colonial buildings in Arequipa
